Teorema, also known as Theorem (UK), is a 1968 Italian allegorical film written and directed by Pier Paolo Pasolini and starring Terence Stamp, Laura Betti, Silvana Mangano, Massimo Girotti and Anne Wiazemsky. Pasolini's sixth film, it was the first time he worked primarily with professional actors. In this film, an upper-class Milanese family is introduced to, and then abandoned by, a divine force. Themes include the timelessness of divinity and the spiritual corruption of the bourgeoisie.

Plot
A mysterious figure known only as "The Visitor" appears in the lives of a typical bourgeois Italian family. His arrival is heralded at the gates of the family's Milanese estate by an arm-flapping postman. The enigmatic stranger soon engages in sexual affairs with all members of the household: the devoutly religious maid, the sensitive son, the sexually repressed mother, the timid daughter and, finally, the tormented father. The stranger gives unstintingly of himself, asking nothing in return. He stops the passionate maid from committing suicide with a gas hose and tenderly consoles her; he befriends and sleeps with the frightened son, soothing his doubts and anxiety and endowing him with confidence; he becomes emotionally intimate with the overprotected daughter, removing her childish innocence about men; he seduces the bored and dissatisfied mother, giving her sexual joy and fulfillment; he cares for and comforts the despondent and suffering father, who has fallen ill.

Then one day the herald returns and announces that the stranger will soon leave the household, just as suddenly and mysteriously as he came. In the subsequent void of the stranger's absence, each family member is forced to confront what was previously concealed by the trappings of bourgeois life. The maid returns to the rural village where she was born and is seen to perform miracles; ultimately, she immolates herself by having her body buried in dirt while shedding ecstatic tears of regeneration. The mother seeks sexual encounters with young men; the son leaves the family home to become an artist; the daughter sinks into a catatonic state; and the father strips himself of all material effects, handing his factory over to its workers, removing his clothes at a railway station and wandering naked into the wilderness, where he finally screams in primal rage and despair.

It has been cited, incorrectly, as being remade as Down and Out in Beverly Hills. Though there are similar themes, the latter is inspired by a much older stage play from around 1932.

Cast

 Terence Stamp as The Visitor
 Laura Betti as Emilia (the maid)
 Silvana Mangano as Lucia (the mother)
 Massimo Girotti as Paolo (the father)
 Anne Wiazemsky as Odetta (the daughter)
 Andrés José Cruz Soublette as Pietro (the son)
 Ninetto Davoli as Angelino (the postman)

Reception
On its release, the religious right and the Vatican criticized the sexual content in the film. Others considered the film "ambiguous" and "visionary". The film won a special award at the Venice Film Festival from the International Catholic Film Office, only for the award to be withdrawn later when the Vatican protested.

Scholars view the film differently due to the openness or ambiguity of the film. The author of A Certain Realism: Making Use of Pasolini’s Film Theory and Practice, Maurizio Viano, says that in order to understand the film there must be "adequate translation". Most scholars writing about the film do not discuss Pasolini's cinematographic techniques but Pasolini's philosophical arguments. Viano argues that Pasolini intended to be theoretical in this film because he wanted to be recognized as "a film theorist".

Structure and title etymology
Teorema means theorem in Italian. Its Greek root is theorema (θεώρημα), meaning simultaneously "spectacle", "intuition", and "theorem". Viano suggests that the film should be considered as "spectatorship" because each family member gazes at the guest and his loins , although this seems unlikely: the Greek word denotes the object of spectatorship, rather than the actual act of spectatorship, which would be theoresis (θεώρησις).

As a term, theorem is also often considered as mathematical or formulaic. In this sense, the film also contains a programmatic structure. It begins with documentary-like images and then moves on to the opening credit with a dark volcanic desert, a home party scene, cuts of the factory in sepia tone, introduction of each family member in silence and sepia tone, and, then, the guest sitting in the back yard in colour. The middle section is divided into three: "seductions", "confessions" and "transformations".

Not only is the film's structure formulaic but so is the psychological development of each character. They all go through "seductions", "confessions" and "transformations". The way each character changes their state of mind is the same. They all fall into a sexual desire for the guest. They all have sex with him. When the guest leaves, they all, except the maid, confess to him how they feel about themselves. In the final section of the film, after he leaves, they lose the identities they previously possessed. The maid goes back to her village and performs miracles while subsisting on nettles, but asks to be buried alive. The daughter falls into a catatonic state. The son maniacally paints his desire for the guest. The mother picks up young men who resemble the guest and has sex with them. The father strips naked in the middle of the train station.

Scholarly interpretations
A common interpretation by cinema scholars is that the film is a commentary on the bourgeois society and emergence of consumerism through the very beginning of the film. The reporter asks a worker at Paolo's factory if he thinks there will be no bourgeois in the future. In The Cinema of Economic Miracles: Visuality and Modernization in the Italian Art Film, Angelo Restivo assumes that Pasolini suggests that even documentary images, which depict facts, fail to show the truth. News can tell the audience only the surface of the events they broadcast. Merely watching the interview of the workers does not tell why factory owner Paolo, gave away the factory. That might be one of the reasons the scene is set in the beginning of the film.

In his biographical work on Pasolini, Pier Paolo Pasolini, Enzo Siciliano assumes that Pasolini expresses his struggle of being homosexual in the film. On the other hand, Viano believes that Pasolini's emphasis is not on homosexuality but rather on sexuality in general, because the guest has sex with each member of the household. Sexuality is considered as passion in Viano's interpretation.

Italian critic Morandini, author of a dictionary of cinema, claimed that "the theorem is demonstrated: the incapacity of modern -bourgeois- man to perceive, listen to, absorb and live the sacred. Only Emilia the servant, who comes from a peasant family, discovers it and, after the 'miracle' of levitation, will return to the ground with a holy smell. It's another film by Pasolini dedicated to the conjunction between Marx and Freud (and, here, Jung and Marcuse too)."

Other versions
The same year, Pasolini expanded this film into a novel with the same name, written simultaneously to the film's production. Giorgio Battistelli composed an opera based on the film. In 2009, Dutch theatre company 'Toneelgroep Amsterdam' created and performed a play version of this movie.

The sketch comedy program Mr. Show aired a segment (series three, episode six) in which a suburban family is slowly revealed, over time, to have all individually had sexual affairs with David Cross, possibly in reference to the film.

Home media
On October 4, 2005, Koch-Lorber Films released the DVD of Teorema in the United States.

On February 18, 2020, The Criterion Collection released a Blu-ray and DVD of Teorema in North America.

Awards
 Nominated for the Golden Lion at the Venice Film Festival
 Laura Betti won the Volpi Cup for Best Actress for her role in the film.

References

Sources
 Restivo, Angelo. The Cinema of Economic Miracles: Visuality and Modernization in the Italian Arts Film. Durham, NC / London: Duke University Press, 2002.
 Siciliano, Enzo. Pier Paolo Pasolini. New York: Random House, Inc., 1982. .
 Testa, Bart. "To Film a Gospel … and Advent of the Theoretical Stranger", 180–209 in Pier Paolo Pasolini: Contemporary Perspectives, ed. Patrick Rumble and Bart Testa. Toronto: University of Toronto Press, 1994.
 Viano, Maurizio S. A Certain Realism: Making Use of Pasolini's Film Theory and Practice. Berkeley, CA / Los Angeles: University of California Press, 1993. .

External links

 "The Atheist Who Was Obsessed with God"  – Interview with Pier Paolo Pasolini conducted by Guy Flatley in 1969 (first published in The New York Times; posted by Flatley on MovieCrazed)
 
 
 
 Teorema (Film-Forward review)
Teorema: Just a Boy an essay by James Quandt at the Criterion Collection

1968 films
1968 drama films
1968 LGBT-related films
Italian drama films
Italian avant-garde and experimental films
Italian LGBT-related films
1960s Italian-language films
English-language Italian films
1960s English-language films
Male bisexuality in film
Films directed by Pier Paolo Pasolini
Films scored by Ennio Morricone
Films set in Milan
Films adapted into operas
1960s avant-garde and experimental films
Italian multilingual films
1960s Italian films